John Alden Lawson Jr. (September 10, 1887 – March 9, 1964) was an American Negro league pitcher in the 1900s.

A native of Belvidere, Illinois, Lawson played for the Leland Giants in 1909. He died in Belvidere in 1964 at age 76.

References

External links
Baseball statistics and player information from Baseball-Reference Black Baseball Stats and Seamheads

1887 births
1964 deaths
Leland Giants players
Baseball pitchers
Baseball players from Illinois
People from Belvidere, Illinois
20th-century African-American people